Sinbaungwe Township or Tantabin Township is a township of Thayet District in the Magway Region of Burma (Myanmar).
It is located to the west of the Pegu Range in the foothills and on the plain of the Irrawaddy.  Most of the township is east of the Irrawaddy, but about 20% of the township lies on the right (west) bank. The major town and administrative center is Sinbaungwe (Tantabin).

History
Sinbaungwe Township was formerly called Myedé Kyan (remnant of Myedé) as it had been part of Myedé Township (now Aunglan Township) before that was divided. In 2008, a local student named Htoo Zaw Naing became the  first student in the township's history to garner 5 distinctions on the National Matriculation Examination.

Bounds
Sinbaungwe Township is bordered by the following townships:
 Magway to the north,
 Taungdwingyi to the north and northeast,
 Lewe of Mandalay Region to the east
 Aunglan (Myayde) to the south,
 Thayet to the southwest, and
 Minhla to the west and northwest.

Villages
Among the many villages and wards (village census tracts) in Sinbaungwe Township are Baingyagon, Bwetsan, Chaungkauk, Egayit, Ingya, Inyon, Konbo, Kyauk-o, Kyigon, Thazi, Wundet, Yebok and Zaunggyandaung.

Economy
Rice growing is the main economic activity in the township.

Notes

External links
 "Sinbaungwe (Tantabin) Google Satellite Map" Maplandia

Townships of Magway Region